USS Gonzalez (DDG-66) is an  in the United States Navy. She is named for Sergeant Alfredo Cantu Gonzalez, a Medal of Honor recipient in the Vietnam War.

Service history
The warship took part in Operation Allied Force, firing Tomahawk cruise missiles at Serbian targets in 1999. She also assisted a cruise ship, Seabourn Spirit, after an abortive attack by pirates off the coast of Somalia in 2005.

On 1 March 2006, she rescued the crew of an Iranian ship, whose engine and rudder were broken down since 18 February. The Iranian crew were returned to Iran. She was involved in the action of 18 March 2006 with suspected pirates, along with the cruiser . Initial reports indicated that one suspected pirate was killed and five others wounded.

On 17 July 2006, CNN reported that Gonzalez would be deployed to help in evacuation efforts of American citizens from Lebanon in the midst of the 2006 Israel-Lebanon conflict. On 26 July 2006, Frank James of The Chicago Tribune reported on the evacuation efforts of Gonzalez.

Awards
 James F. Chezek Memorial Gunnery Award (1998)

References

External links

 Official site 
 Official blog by Cmdr. Brian Fort, ship's captain

 

Arleigh Burke-class destroyers
Destroyers of the United States
Ships built in Bath, Maine
1995 ships